The Gossip Game is an American reality television series on VH1 that debuted on April 1, 2013, and chronicles the lives of seven media personalities who cover the urban entertainment market and reside in New York City. Cast member Vivian Billings confirmed via her blog in June 2013 that the series will not be returning for a second season.

Cast
 Angela Yee
 Candice "Ms. Drama" Williams
 JasFly
 K. Foxx
 Kimberly Osorio
 Sharon Carpenter
 Vivian Billings

Episodes

References

2010s American reality television series
2013 American television series debuts
2013 American television series endings
English-language television shows
Television shows set in New York City
VH1 original programming